Kiryat Ata (also Qiryat Ata) is a city in the Haifa District of Israel.

History  
The Early Bronze Age site at Qiryat Ata has been extensively excavated since 1990, revealing stratified remains from the Neolithic, EB (=early Bronze Age), IB and EB II periods. At Tell el ‘Idham remains from a continuous habitation from the early Bronze Age, through the Persian age down to the Roman era have been identified.

Archaeologists Mordechai Aviam and Dan Barag (1935–2009) thought it to be the Capharatha mentioned by Josephus in the Lower Galilee, one of several views tentatively identified for the site.

Rock-hewn winepresses dating to the  Byzantine era have been found here. Some have had crosses and Greek letters incised, supporting the theory that there was a Byzantine monastery located in the area. Ceramics from the Byzantine era have also been found here, and a building from the Byzantine or early Islamic period has been excavated.

In 1283 it was mentioned as part of the domain of the Crusaders, according to  the hudna between the Crusaders  and the Mamluk sultan Qalawun. At the time it was called Kafrata. Ceramics from the Mamluk era have also been found here. An excavation at Independence Street, Qiryat Ata, showed nearly continuous settlement dating from the Persian and Hellenistic eras up to the Mamluk era (late eleventh–early fifteenth century CE).

Ottoman era
Incorporated into the Ottoman Empire in 1517, Kufrata appeared in the census of 1596, located in the Nahiya of Acca, part of Safad Sanjak. The population was 15  households, all Muslim. They paid a fixed tax rate of 20% on wheat, barley, fruit trees, cotton, goats and beehives, in addition to occasional revenues; a total of 1,508 akçe.

The village appeared under the name of Koufour Tai on the map that Pierre Jacotin compiled during Napoleon's invasion of 1799, while in 1856 it was named Kefr Ette on Kiepert's map of Palestine published that year.

In 1859 the population was estimated to be 100, and the cultivation was 16 feddans. In 1875 Victor Guérin visited, and found the village to have 50 houses.

In 1881 the Palestine Exploration Fund's Survey of Western Palestine described Kefr Etta as "a small adobe village, on the plain, with a well on the north and olives on the east."

A population list from about 1887 showed that Kh. Kefr Etta had about 285 inhabitants; all Muslims.

British Mandate era

In the 1922 census of Palestine conducted by the British Mandate authorities, Kufritta showed a population of 400; 7 Christians and 393 Muslims, where all the Christians were of the Orthodox faith.

The area was acquired by the Jewish community as part of the Sursock Purchase. In 1925 a Zionist organisation purchased  10,000 dunums from Alexander Sursock, of the Sursock family of Beirut.  At the time, there were 75 families living there.

In the 1931 census  Kufritta had a population of 4  Muslims and 29 Jews,  in a total of 13 occupied houses.

In 1934, one of the country's largest textile plants, ATA, was established there.

In the 1945 statistics the population of Kfar Atta (Kufritta) consisted of 1,690 Jews and the land area was 6,131 dunams, according to an official land and population survey. Of this, 6 dunams were designated for  citrus and bananas, 39 dunams for plantations and irrigable land, 1,527 for cereals, while 3,591 dunams were built-up (urban) areas.

Kiryat Ata

In the early 20th century, the lands of the Arab village of Kefr Etta were purchased by a Warsaw religious foundation named "Avodat Israel" through intermediaries in the American Zion Commonwealth. Avodat Israel founded Ata in 1925.  During the 1929 Arab riots the town was attacked and abandoned. A year later the residents returned and rebuilt the community. The town was renamed Kfar Ata in 1940, which was also the name of the local textile factory. In 1965, when the village was merged with adjacent Kiryat Binyamin, the name became Kiryat Ata.

Climate
Kiryat Ata has a Mediterranean climate with hot, dry summers and cool and rainy winters. 
The hottest month is July and the coldest is February. Snowfall is rare, but snow was recorded three times in the 20th century:  in 1950, 1992 and 1999. Annual precipitation is approximately 524 millimeters (21 in).

Demographics 
According to CBS, in 2001 the ethnic makeup of the city was 99.8% Jewish and other non-Arab, without a significant Arab population. See Population groups in Israel. According to CBS, in 2001 there were 23,700 males and 24,900 females. The population of the city was spread out, with 31.4% 19 years of age or younger, 15.7% between 20 and 29, 18.5% between 30 and 44, 18.3% from 45 to 59, 4.1% from 60 to 64, and 11.9% 65 years of age or older. The population growth rate in 2001 was 0.8%.

Education 
In 2000, there were 20 schools and 8,762 students in the city: 14 elementary schools with 4,899 students, and 11 high schools with 3,863  students. 52.0% of 12th graders were entitled to a matriculation certificate in 2001.

Landmarks

The Fisher House, home of Yehoshua Fisher, one of the pioneers and leaders of the Kfar Ata Jewish community, was refurbished. The 19th century building houses the Municipal Museum of the History of Kiryat Ata.

Sports
The city's main football club, Maccabi Ironi Kiryat Ata, plays in Liga Alef, the third tier of Israeli football. The local basketball club, Elitzur Kiryat Ata, are in Ligat HaAl, the top division.

Archaeology
Archaeological surveys at Khirbet Sharta in the northeast part of the city revealed traces of habitation dating to the Bronze, Iron, Hellenistic, Roman, Byzantine, and Mamluk eras. In 2010, an archaeological survey was conducted at the ancient site of Kiryat Ata by Hagit Turge on behalf of the Israel Antiquities Authority (IAA), and in 2014 and 2016 by Orit Segal.

Sister cities
  Reinickendorf, Germany (since 1976)

Notable people

Shai Abuhatsira (born 1980), deputy mayor of Haifa
Alon Abutbul, actor
Avraham Abutbul (1961–2012), actor and singer
Erez Lev Ari, singer-songwriter
 Tal Friedman (born 1963), comedian, actor and musician
Yuval Noah Harari, author and historian, was born in Kiryat Ata
Shani Hazan (born 1992), beauty pageant titleholder (Miss Israel 2012)
Ishtar (born 1968), French-Israeli singer
Yaniv Katan (born 1981), association football player
Hovi Star, singer
 Meir Tapiro (born 1975), Israeli basketball player, and current CEO of Ironi Nes Ziona
 Haim Yavin (born 1932), television anchor and documentary filmmaker
Yossi Yona (born 1953), academic and politician
Eti Zach, singer

References

Bibliography

External links
 CBS population estimates for 2005/2006
 Municipality website
 Beit Fischer City Museum 
Survey of Western Palestine, Map 5:    IAA, Wikimedia commons 

Cities in Israel
1929 Palestine riots
Krayot
Cities in Haifa District